"He Loves Me 2" is a 1999 song by the musician CeCe Peniston. This single was to be originally included on the singer's album, which was not released. A remix of the song, Paul Johnson's Dancefloor Dub, entered the Billboard Hot Dance Music/Club Play chart, where it peaked at number twenty-four in November 1999, after being classified number five as the Billboard Hot Dance Breakouts in the Club Play category.

As with the Peniston's previous single ("Nobody Else") recorded with Steve Hurley, the Silk's 12" Mix of the song brought the producer a Grammy Award nomination in 2000 as Remixer of the Year, Non-Classical.

The song was in addition included to Deeper Rhythms: The House Sessions, Vol 1, a compilation of club-oriented dance music exclusively featuring American artists, issued on Max Records, and became the most successful single taken from the album.

Credits and personnel
 CeCe Peniston – lead/back vocal, writer
 Steve Hurley – writer, remix, arranger, producer
 Marc Williams  – writer
 Paul Leighton Johnson – remix, additional producer
 Junior Vasquez – remix, additional producer
 Kazuhiko Gomi – programming
 Silktone Songs Inc. (ASCAP) – publisher
 InDaSoul Songs, Inc. (ASCAP) – publisher
 Didier – mastering at Top Master

Track listings and formats

 12", FR, #FTR 4053 6
 "He Loves Me 2" (Silk's 12" Mix) - 8:39
 "He Loves Me 2" (Paul Johnson's Vocal Dub) - 8:44

 12", US, #SENT 9903
 "He Loves Me 2" (Silk's 12" Mix) - 8:39
 "He Loves Me 2" (Silk's Tribal Reprise) - 3:10
 "He Loves Me 2" (Paul Johnson's Vocal Dub) - 8:44
 "He Loves Me 2" (Paul Johnson's Dancefloor Dub) - 7:04

 12", US, #SENT 9903B-1
 "He Loves Me 2" (Junior's Love 2 Club Mix) - 10:39
 "He Loves Me 2" (Junior Loves 2 Beat the Drums) 
 "He Loves Me 2" (Junior's Loves 2 Club Mix Instrumental) - 10:39
 "He Loves Me 2" (Junior Loves 2 Beat the Drums Again) 

 MCD, US, Promo, #()
 "He Loves Me 2" (Junior's Love 2 Club Mix) - 10:39
 "He Loves Me 2" (Junior's Loves 2 Club Mix Instrumental) - 10:39
 "He Loves Me 2" (Junior Loves 2 Beat the Drums) 
 "He Loves Me 2" (Junior Loves 2 Beat the Drums Again) 
 "He Loves Me 2" (Bonus - Silk's Acappella) 

 MCD, FR, #FTR 4053-2
 "He Loves Me 2" (Silk's Radio Edit) - 4:05
 "He Loves Me 2" (Roller Disco Edit) - 3:45
 "He Loves Me 2" (Silk's 12" Mix) - 8:39
 "He Loves Me 2" (Paul Johnson's Vocal Dub) - 8:44
 "He Loves Me 2" (Paul Johnson's Dancefloor Dub) - 7:04
 "He Loves Me 2" (Junior's Love 2 Club Mix) - 10:39
 "He Loves Me 2" (Roller Discoclub Mix) - 6:45

 VA
Silk Entertainment Sampler12", US, #SENT 9901-1  3. "He Loves Me 2" (Original Demo)

Charts

Weekly charts

Music awards and nominations
Grammy Awards

References

General

 Specific

External links 
 

1999 singles
CeCe Peniston songs
Songs written by CeCe Peniston
Songs written by Steve "Silk" Hurley
1999 songs
Songs written by M-Doc